Arboga Airfield  serves the city of Arboga in Västmanland County, Sweden. It is a former Swedish Airforce backup base located outside of Arboga used by the Test Unit of SWAF for tests of airborne missiles. Today, the airfield is solely used by the local flying club.

Facilities
It has a  asphalt paved runway (15/33) with a parallel taxiway. Currently, only  is used, because of a road over the runways southern end where former Air Force revetments can be seen.

References

External links
 

Airports in Sweden
Buildings and structures in Västmanland County